Big Brother Greece 6 was the sixth season of the Greek reality television series Big Brother. The show returned after a nine-year hiatus and began airing on 29 August 2020 on Skai TV and ended after 113 days on 18 December 2020, nineteen years after the first season aired. It was the first season of Big Brother to air on Skai TV. The show also simulcast live in Cyprus on Sigma TV like in the last season.

This season was originally scheduled to start on 15 March 2020. But was postponed until further notice by Skai TV due to the impact of COVID-19 pandemic in Greece.

Harry Varthakouris presented the show. Andreas Mikroutsikos was the opinionist. The winner received €100,000.

Anna-Maria Psycharaki was announced as the winner of the season, with Sofia Danezi as the runner-up.

Production
In October 2019, it was announced by Endemol Shine Group that Skai TV bought the rights to air the show in 2020. After an open call for participants, a record 10,000 submissions were received by Skai TV.

Premiere postponed 
Season 6 of Big Brother Greece was scheduled to begin airing on 15 March 2020, however, due to the impact of COVID-19 pandemic in Greece, on the day of the scheduled premiere day, Skai TV announced that they put housemates and employees' safety and health at the top priority, therefore temporarily postpone the premiere of the show until further notice.

Live show
In February 2020, Harry Varthakouris was announced as the host for the live shows. Andreas Mikroutsikos took part in the live shows as an opinionist. In each live show, there is a psychologist as the second opinionist. In the premiere show and the first live eviction show, the opinionist was Dimitra Zafira. Since the second live eviction show, the opinionist was Elpida Georgakopoulou.

There were one or two celebrities as the opinionist in live eviction shows. In the fifth live show, it was Grigoris Gountaras, in the sixth live show it was Giorgos Tsalikis. In the eleventh live show, they were Giorgos Papadopoulos and Natali Kakava. In the twelfth live show, they were Margie Lazarou and Vasilis Grigoropoulos. In the thirteenth live show, they were Natali Kakava and Nikos Georgiadis.

Broadcasting
The premiere show aired on Saturday 29 August 2020, but it was pre-recorded a day prior.

The highlights shows were broadcast from Mondays to Thursdays from 11:00 pm to 01:00 am. The live eviction shows were broadcast on Fridays at 09:00 pm to 01:00 am.

Live streaming
Viewers can watch 23 hours a day live from the Big Brother house, on the official website skaitv.gr. The live streaming started after the end of the second episode on Monday 31 August.

On Monday 7 September 2020, Skai TV permanently stopped the live streaming, due to the unacceptable disrespectful sexist comments about rape from housemate Antonis Alexandridis, which also caused huge controversy in the outside world. After one week, on 14 September the live streaming returned on YouTube, but after 3 weeks Skai TV reclosed the live streaming.

House
The house was located in Koropi, Attica. It's a state-of-the-art space of 700  m2 with a 12-meter pool. In the house, there are 56 cameras and 50 microphones installed. To make it, 20 containers with specialized technical equipment arrived from the Netherlands and worked nightly for two months with more than 400 people, 25 different garages.

Format

Weekly task
Every week Big Brother put to the housemates in tasks to earn money to buy food for themselves. The housemates are doing tasks daily and if they won, they would earn 100€. If they lost, they won nothing.

House Captain
Every week, a House Captain would be chosen. The Captain is given luxuries, such as the Captain Room, it's a personal bedroom for their own. Also, the house captain is immuned for a week.

Power of Veto
The housemates are selected to compete in the Power of Veto competition. The winner of the Veto competition wins the right to either revoke the nomination of one of the nominated Housemates or leave them as is.

Hot seat
Every week in the live shows, a housemate sits in the hot seat, where this is in a room. Andreas Mikroutsikos and the viewers from social media are asking the housemate some questions.

Blue Room
Since week 5, in the live eviction shows, a special guest goes in the house. This can be someone from the family of the housemate or in the room can go Andreas Mikroutsikos, where he speaks with the housemates for what is going on in the house.

Twin twist
This season of Big Brother Greece introduced a twin twist like in the fifth and seventeenth season of the American version. The twist was that a set of twins were switching spots in the house, intending to make it to the first week. Christos Varouxis' twin brother, Panagiotis Varouxis enter the house in secret at the end of the premiere. The twins, Christos V. and Panagiotis, both played as Christos V. and would switch places at various times in the Captain room. Their secret mission is that they must make the other housemates thinking that they are one person. After one week, the twist was revealed to the other housemates and then the twins played together as a single Housemate. Since Week 5, Big Brother allowed them to play individually in the game.

Housemates
On the first day, eighteen housemates entered the house. After the first week, two new housemates entered the house. On week 3, a new housemate entered the house.

Nominations table
 Twin twist and 2-in-1 housemate, their nominations counted as one. (Week 2 - 4)

Notes
 : Identical twins Christos V. and Panagiotis took turns playing as a single housemate during the first week for a secret mission. They secretly switched places between living inside the house and being in the Captain's Room. Both twins pretended to be Christos V.. On the first live eviction show on Day 8, the secret was revealed to the house and Panagiotis was allowed to live inside the house under his own identity.
 : Christina and Rania won the immunity challenge, therefore, were safe for the week.
 : Sofia received the veto for choosing the bed with the number 13.
 : On Day 10, Antonis was ejected from the house for making unacceptable disrespectful comments about rape.
 :  The twin brothers Christos V. and Panagiotis nominated together.
 : Aphrodite and Nikos were the two housemates nominated for eviction. However, it was later revealed that there would be a third person to be nominated on Friday's live show. During the live show, the housemates had to vote for a third housemate to be nominated for eviction. The housemate that received the most nominations would be the third nominee. There was a tie between Rania and Sofia, so they were both nominated. Dimitris K., who had the power of Veto, was able to save one of the four nominees. He chose to save Sofia. In the end, Aphrodite, Nikos and Rania were nominated for eviction.
 : On Week 5, Big Brother split Christos V. and Panagiotis, who played as one housemate, from now on they both play alone as two individual housemates.
 : The housemates participated in a challenge where one of the two winners would get immunity and the other the Power of Veto. Dimitris K. and Grigoris won the challenge. Dimitris K. got the immunity and Grigoris got the Power of Veto.
 : Afroditi and Sofia were automatically nominated as a punishment for breaking the rules. They couldn't be saved by the Power of Veto.
 : Big Brother gave the power to the captain, Dimitris K., to nominate one of the housemates. He nominated Anna-Maria.
 : Anna-Maria was automatically nominated as a punishment for breaking the rules. She couldn't nominate, couldn't be saved by the Power of Veto and couldn't compete for the Veto. She also couldn't be the House Captain for next week.
 : Big Brother gave Dimitris K., the captain of the week, the power for one of his votes to count as a double vote. He gave the double vote to Christos V..
 : On Week 10, Big Brother decided that none of the housemates would be evicted.
 : During the 10th live show, the housemates voted the first housemate that they wanted to be against the public vote next week.
 : Dimitris K. was automatically nominated as a punishment for breaking the rules. He couldn't be saved from the Power of Veto and also wasn't able to compete for the Veto.
 : On Week 15, there was no Captain and Veto. All housemates played 6 games in two rounds. The two winners from each round would automatically make it to the finale, and the rest would be nominated for eviction automatically. Zak won the first round and Grigoris the second.
 : For the final week, the public voted for the winner.

Ratings
Official ratings are taken from AGB Hellas.

References

External links
 Official website  on skaitv.gr

2020 Greek television seasons
06
Television productions suspended due to the COVID-19 pandemic